Vernon County is a county in the U.S. state of Wisconsin. As of the 2020 census, the population was 30,714. Its county seat is Viroqua.

History
Vernon County was renamed from Bad Ax County on March 22, 1862. Bad Ax County had been created on March 1, 1851, from territory that had been part of Richland and Crawford counties. The name Vernon was chosen to reflect the county's green fields of wheat and to evoke Mount Vernon.

Geography

Major highways

  U.S. Highway 14
  U.S. Highway 61
  Highway 27 (Wisconsin)
  Highway 33 (Wisconsin)
  Highway 35 (Wisconsin)
  Highway 56 (Wisconsin)
  Highway 80 (Wisconsin)
  Highway 82 (Wisconsin)
  Highway 131 (Wisconsin)
  Highway 162 (Wisconsin)

Railroads
BNSF

Buses
Scenic Mississippi Regional Transit
List of intercity bus stops in Wisconsin

Airports
 Viroqua Municipal Airport (Y51) serves the county and surrounding communities.
 The Joshua Sanford Field airport (KHBW) closed on November 10, 2016.

Adjacent counties

 La Crosse County - northwest
 Monroe County - north
 Juneau County - northeast
 Sauk County - east
 Richland County - southeast
 Crawford County - south
 Allamakee County, Iowa - southwest
 Houston County, Minnesota - west

Demographics and religion statistics

2020 census
As of the census of 2020, the population was 30,714. The racial makeup of the county was 95.4% White, 0.4% Black or African American, 0.3% Asian, 0.2% Native American, 0.8% from other races, and 2.9% from two or more races. Ethnically, the population was 1.5% Hispanic or Latino of any race.

2000 census

As of the census of 2000, there were 28,056 people, 10,825 households, and 7,501 families residing in the county.  The population density was 35 people per square mile (14/km2).  There were 12,416 housing units at an average density of 16 per square mile (6/km2).  The racial makeup of the county was 98.81% White, 0.06% Black or African American, 0.15% Native American, 0.21% Asian, 0.01% Pacific Islander, 0.27% from other races, and 0.48% from two or more races.  0.66% of the population were Hispanic or Latino of any race. 38.3% were of Norwegian, 26.9% German, 6.4% Irish and 6.1% English ancestry. 90.9% spoke English, 3.5% German, 1.8% Norwegian, 1.2% Pennsylvania Dutch and 1.0% Spanish as their first language.

There were 10,825 households, out of which 31.50% had children under the age of 18 living with them, 58.70% were married couples living together, 6.80% had a female householder with no husband present, and 30.70% were non-families. 26.70% of all households were made up of individuals, and 13.70% had someone living alone who was 65 years of age or older.  The average household size was 2.55 and the average family size was 3.11.

In the county, the population was spread out, with 27.40% under the age of 18, 6.80% from 18 to 24, 25.30% from 25 to 44, 23.50% from 45 to 64, and 17.00% who were 65 years of age or older.  The median age was 39 years. For every 100 females there were 97.70 males.  For every 100 females age 18 and over, there were 95.60 males.

In 2017, there were 434 births, giving a general fertility rate of 90.5 births per 1000 women aged 15–44, the fourth highest rate out of all 72 Wisconsin counties. Of these births, 123 occurred at home, second only to Clark County which had 184 home births.

In 2010, the largest religious groups by reported number of adherents were ELCA Lutheran at 6,735 adherents, Catholic at 3,060 adherents, Amish at 2,786 adherents, United Methodist at 1,533 adherents, Wisconsin Synod Lutheran at 1,402 adherents, and Non-denominational Christian at 766 adherents.

Economy
The county is home to the headquarters of Organic Valley, the world's largest cooperative of family farmers.

Parks
Vernon County is home to multiple county and state parks. The Kickapoo Valley Reserve, an 8600-acre natural reserve, is between the villages of La Farge and Ontario. Wildcat Mountain State Park is also in the county.

County Parks and Forests
  Blackhawk Park
  Duck Egg County Forest
  Esofea/Rentz Memorial Park
  Jersey Valley Park
  Kooyumjian - Lost Creek County Forest
  Runge Hollow Recreation Area
  Sidie Hollow Park
  Wayside Park & Coon Prairie Trail

Communities

Cities
 Hillsboro
 Viroqua (county seat)
 Westby

Villages

 Chaseburg
 Coon Valley
 De Soto (partly in Crawford County)
 Genoa
 La Farge
 Ontario
 Readstown
 Stoddard
 Viola (mostly in Richland County)

Towns

 Bergen
 Christiana
 Clinton
 Coon
 Forest
 Franklin
 Genoa
 Greenwood
 Hamburg
 Harmony
 Hillsboro
 Jefferson
 Kickapoo
 Liberty
 Stark
 Sterling
 Union
 Viroqua
 Webster
 Wheatland
 Whitestown

Unincorporated communities

 Avalanche
 Bloomingdale
 Bud
 Dell
 Dilly
 Esofea
 Fargo
 Folsom
 Greenwood
 Kickapoo Center
 Liberty
 Liberty Pole
 Mount Tabor
 Newry
 Newton
 Pleasant Valley
 Purdy
 Red Mound
 Retreat
 Rockton
 Romance
 Ross
 Springville
 Sugar Grove
 Trippville
 Tunnelville (partial)
 Valley
 Victory
 West Prairie
 White City

Gallery

Politics
Vernon County had been a Democratic-leaning county since the 1988 presidential election, but Republican Donald Trump won a plurality of the vote in 2016 and a majority of the vote in 2020.

See also
 Blackhawk Park
 National Register of Historic Places listings in Vernon County, Wisconsin
 Upper Mississippi River National Wildlife and Fish Refuge

References

Further reading
 History of Vernon County, Wisconsin. Springfield, Ill.: Union Publishing Company, 1884.
 Rogers, Earl M. (ed.) Memoirs of Vernon County. Madison, Wis.: Western Historical Association, 1907.

External links

 Vernon County
 Vernon County map from the Wisconsin Department of Transportation
 Vernon County Health and Demographic Data
 Vernon County Broadcaster

 
Wisconsin counties on the Mississippi River
1851 establishments in Wisconsin
Populated places established in 1851